200 is a year.

200 may also refer to:
200 (number)
200 metres, a running event
200 Series Shinkansen, a train model
"200" (South Park), an episode of South Park
"200" (Stargate SG-1), an episode of Stargate SG-1
"200" (Criminal Minds), an episode of Criminal Minds
Billboard 200, a record chart
Chrysler 200, a car introduced by Chrysler in 2010
Lexus IS 200, a compact executive car sold by Lexus
Rover 200 / 25 or Rover 200, a car made by the Rover Group

See also 
200 series (disambiguation)